Hajji Ahmad Shahvazayi (also Romanized as Ḩājjī Aḩmad Shāhvazāyī; also known as Deh-e Ḩājj Aḩmad) is a village in Jahanabad Rural District, in the Central District of Hirmand County, Sistan and Baluchestan Province, Iran. At the 2006 census, its population was 145, in 26 families.

References 

Populated places in Hirmand County